The White-Todd Baronetcy, of Eaton Place in the City of Westminster, was a title in the Baronetage of the United Kingdom. It was created on 20 June 1913 for Joseph White-Todd, a wealthy merchant banker and Chairman of the Phoenix Assurance Company. The title became extinct on his death in 1926.

White-Todd baronets, of Eaton Place (1913)
Sir Joseph White-Todd, 1st Baronet (1846–1926)

References

External links
Portrait of Sir Joseph White-Todd, Bt.

Extinct baronetcies in the Baronetage of the United Kingdom